LGC, Biosearch Technologies, is a biotechnology company headquartered in Hoddesdon, UK. Formerly known as LGC Genomics, which acquired Biosearch Technologies, Inc. - located in Petaluma, CA in 2015 (a vertically integrated company that specializes in custom synthesized oligonucleotides for qPCR, cGMP oligos for molecular diagnostics, and DNA/RNA synthesis reagents. Their GMP (Good Manufacturing Practice) manufacturing facility is located in Novato, California. ) LGC, Biosearch Technologies has also recently acquired Douglas Scientific, located in Alexandria MN (designs, manufactures, tests and provides service support. Continually expanding their genomics portfolio offerings, ranging from high quality PCR reagents, custom genotyping assays, genomic services, gene editing and NGS services, as well as workflow solutions for DNA sample preparation and downstream processing

LGC, Biosearch Technologies employs over 2,400 people, operating out of 22 countries worldwide. Part of the Genomics Division of LGC, Biosearch Technologies has a network of nine manufacturing facilities and three service labs and serves customers across a number of markets including pharmaceuticals, agricultural biotechnology, diagnostics, food safety, environment, government and academia.

With a history dating back to 1842, LGC has been home to the UK Government Chemist for more than 100 years and is the designated UK National Measurement Institute for chemical and bio measurement. LGC was privatized in 1996, and is now owned by funds affiliated with KKR.

Products and services

Black Hole Quencher dyes
In 2000, Biosearch Technologies developed a dark quencher known as the Black Hole Quencher (BHQ) dyes, which has become an industry standard product and is currently licensed out to a number of other oligonucleotide manufacturers, biotechnology and molecular diagnostic manufacturers.  The series of Black Hole Quencher dyes have no native fluorescence, high signal-to-noise ratios providing greater sensitivity, and exceptional coupling efficiency.  BHQ dyes are able to quench the entire visible spectrum and near IR spectrum, allowing for a broader range of fluorogenic reporter dyes, which makes the Black Hole Quenchers ideal for multiplexing assays.

Fluorogenic probes and primers
The research team at Biosearch Technologies also developed other fluorescent dyes such as the CAL Fluor, Quasar, and Pulsar series of dyes, which emit fluorescence from 500-700 nanometers. Equipped with the various technology in fluorescent dyes and quenchers, much of Biosearch Technologies' business comes from the design and manufacture of custom probes and primers, which are commonly used for genomic applications such as quantitative PCR and SNP genotyping.

ValuPanel reagents
During the 2009 H1N1 Pandemic, Biosearch Technologies became the first to license from the CDC the H1N1 Influenza and Influenza A sub-typing panel signatures. They would later obtain a license for the “pdm” H1N1 signatures as well. With these licenses from the CDC, Biosearch Technologies manufactured probes and primers to discriminate the various flu signatures as part of their ValuPanel Reagents product line.

In 2013, Biosearch responded to the Avian Influenza A (H7N9) outbreak in China by providing an H7N9 detection panel.

Stellaris FISH probes

In 2010, Biosearch Technologies acquired an exclusive license to the single molecule fish technology developed by scientists at University of Medicine and Dentistry of New Jersey. The technology is now branded as Stellaris FISH, and is a method of detecting and quantifying mRNA and other long RNA molecules in cell culture or tissue samples. The technology is a refinement of earlier RNA ISH technologies, and uses multiple single labeled DNA oligonucleotide probes to increase sensitivity and specificity.

Design service - RealTimeDesign
Biosearch Technologies offers a free, web-based design service known as RealTimeDesign (RTD) equipped with comprehensive algorithms that allow the software to model and propose quantitative PCR and SNP genotyping assays. RealTimeDesign is meant to help scientists craft custom oligonucleotides, averaging 99% in amplification efficiency through a series of different features offered by the software. Some of those features include a direct link to NCBI and BLAST databases as well as a selection of user-modifiable parameters.

History

Founding
Although Biosearch Technologies was founded in 1993, its roots can be traced back to 1979 when it was preceded by Dr. Ronald Cook's first company, Biosearch, Inc.  Biosearch, Inc. experienced 9 years of DNA synthesis instrumentation and chemistry by playing a key role in engineering and manufacturing one of the first automated solid-phase DNA synthesis instruments, the SAM I.  As time progressed, Biosearch was also able to bring other DNA synthesizers to market such as the Biosearch 8700, Biosearch 8800 Prep, and the Cyclone.

Mergers and acquisitions
In 1987, Biosearch was acquired by New Brunswick Scientific, who sold the Biosearch unit to Millipore Corporation in 1988. By 1989, Biosearch was renamed Milligen-Biosearch.  Due to the loss of several corporate officers, Milligen-Biosearch was subsequently acquired by PerSeptive Biosystems which in turn was acquired by Applied Biosystems who eventually retired the Biosearch name and products.

After taking a short hiatus, Dr. Cook decided to return to the oligonucleotide industry and founded what is currently known as Biosearch Technologies, Inc.  In 2013, Biosearch acquired the oligonucleotide manufacturing arm of DNA Technology and the entirety of VitraBio, a maker of porous glass.

Recognition in PCR research
When Kary Mullis received the Nobel Prize in 1993 and gave his Nobel Lecture concerning his invention of the polymerase chain reaction (PCR) method, he gratefully acknowledged Biosearch and Dr. Cook's role in providing him one of the first SAM I DNA synthesizers which was used in support of Kary Mullis' PCR research.

References

Kary B. Mullis' Nobel Lecture, December 8, 1993
Millipore Corporation's Company History on Answers.com
New Brunswick Scientific's Company History on Answers.com
The Biosearch Story on Biosearchtech.com
Sigma Aldrich - Black Hole Quencher webpage
Glen Research - Black Hole Quencher webpage
Genetic Engineering News - PCR Applications Continue to Expand, October 1, 2006

External links
Biosearch Technologies' website
RealTimeDesign: Online Design Service for qPCR and SNP Genotyping Assays
Patents assigned to Biosearch Technologies by the United States Patent and Trademark Office
Ontario Cancer Institute's use of Biosearch Technologies' Products
University of Texas Medical Branch's use of Probes Labeled with Black Hole Quencher

Biotechnology companies of the United States
Research support companies
Novato, California
Petaluma, California
Technology companies based in the San Francisco Bay Area
Biotechnology companies established in 1993
1993 establishments in California